USS Marion was a sloop-of-war of the third rate in the Union Navy during the American Civil War launched at the Boston Navy Yard on 24 April 1839. On 10 November 1839, she departed Boston on her first cruise, to Brazil. Sunk when heaved down in the harbor at Rio de Janeiro early in 1842, she was raised and sailed back to Boston, arriving in May. She then set sail for the Caribbean, returning in May 1843. For the next few years, she remained in ordinary at Boston and then cruised off the West Coast of Africa and in the Mediterranean until 1848. She captured the Casket, a slaver, near Cabinda on 2 August 1846. After a tour in the East Indies from 1850–52, she resumed operations with the African Squadron from 1853–55 and 1858-60, capturing three more slaving ships: Brothers off Mayumba on 8 September 1858 and Orion and Ardennes in late April 1859 off the coast of Kongo. 1856-57 was spent in ordinary at Norfolk.

Marion was in ordinary service at Portsmouth, New Hampshire, when the Civil War broke out. She was recommissioned on 21 June 1861, and on 14 July sailed in search of the Confederate States of America cruiser CSS Jeff Davis. In September, she joined the Gulf Blockading Squadron, participating in the capture of Ship Island on the 16th.

In May 1862, Marion was ordered to Boston for repairs. Back in service by 24 July, she sailed south to Annapolis, Maryland where she was employed as a practice ship for midshipmen until 1870. In 1871, she entered the Portsmouth Navy Yard, decommissioned and was rebuilt as a third-rate screw steamer.

Recommissioned on 12 January 1876, she cruised on the European and South Atlantic Squadrons until December 1882, when she returned to Portsmouth. In 1885, she was ordered to the Pacific, where she was employed on the Asiatic Station until 1890. She then returned to the U.S., served briefly in the Bering Sea Squadron on duty connected with the seal fisheries, and, in late 1891, resumed operations with the Asiatic Squadron. Assigned to the Pacific Squadron in 1895, she cruised along the west coast of the Americas and amongst the Hawaiian Islands until 11 December 1897, when she decommissioned at Mare Island, California.

Subsequently, transferred to the custody of the State of California, she was employed as a training ship and headquarters for the California State Naval Militia. She was docked at San Francisco, California, pier No. 10 until 1907. On 14 March 1907, she was struck from the Naval Vessel Register and sold on 24 July to C. E. Boudrow, San Francisco.

External links

See also

List of sloops of war of the United States Navy
Bibliography of early American naval history

References

 

Sloops of the United States Navy
Ships of the Union Navy
Ships built in Boston
1839 ships